Jacob Franklin "Stump" Edington (July 4, 1891 – November 11, 1969) was a Major League Baseball right fielder who played for the Pittsburgh Pirates for about a month in 1912 (June 20-July 13).

Edington played well during his time with the Pirates.  In 15 games he hit .302 (16-for-53) with 2 triples, 12 runs batted in, and 4 runs scored.  In the field he handled 25 chances flawlessly for a fielding percentage of 1.000.  He was one of seven different players to appear in right field for the team that season.

Three of his famous teammates on the Pirates were future Hall of Famers Honus Wagner, Max Carey, and Bill McKechnie.

After his brief career with the Pirates, he returned to play in the Central League from 1915-1917, the Pacific Coast League from 1919-1921 and the Texas League from 1922-1928. He was a player/manager with the Beaumont Exporters of the Texas League in 1923 and after his playing career ended, he managed a couple of teams in 1928.

Edington died at the age of 78 in Bastrop, Louisiana.

External links

1891 births
1969 deaths
Major League Baseball right fielders
Baseball players from Indiana
Pittsburgh Pirates players
Minor league baseball managers
Grand Rapids Black Sox players
Vernon Tigers players
Beaumont Exporters players
Fort Worth Panthers players
Waco Cubs players
Paris Bourbonites players
Winchester Hustlers players